Internet art (also known as net art) is a form of new media art distributed via the Internet. This form of art circumvents the traditional dominance of the physical gallery and museum system. In many cases, the viewer is drawn into some kind of interaction with the work of art. Artists working in this manner are sometimes referred to as net artists.

Net artists may use specific social or cultural internet traditions to produce their art outside of the technical structure of the internet. Internet art is often — but not always — interactive, participatory, and multimedia-based. Internet art can be used to spread a message, either political or social, using human interactions.

The term Internet art typically does not refer to art that has been simply digitized and uploaded to be viewable over the Internet, such as in an online gallery.
Rather, this genre relies intrinsically on the Internet to exist as a whole, taking advantage of such aspects as an interactive interface and connectivity to multiple social and economic cultures and micro-cultures, not only web-based works.

New media theorist and curator Jon Ippolito defined "Ten Myths of Internet Art" in 2002. He cites the above stipulations, as well as defining it as distinct from commercial web design, and touching on issues of permanence, archivability, and collecting in a fluid medium.

History and context
Internet art is rooted in disparate artistic traditions and movements, ranging from Dada to Situationism, conceptual art, Fluxus, video art, kinetic art, performance art, telematic art and happenings.

In 1974, Canadian artist Vera Frenkel worked with the Bell Canada Teleconferencing Studios to produce the work String Games: Improvisations for Inter-City Video, the first artwork in Canada to use telecommunications technologies.

An early telematic artwork was Roy Ascott's work, La Plissure du Texte,
performed in collaboration created for an exhibition at the Musée d'Art Moderne de la Ville de Paris in 1983.

In 1985, Eduardo Kac created the animated videotex poem Reabracadabra for the Minitel system.

Media art institutions such as Ars Electronica Festival in Linz, or the Paris-based IRCAM (a research center for electronic music), would also support or present early networked art. In 1996, Helen Thorington founded Turbulence.org, an online platform for commissioning and exhibiting net art, and hosting multi location networked performances. in 1991 Wolfgang Staehle founded the important experimental platform such as The Thing. in 1994 entrepreneur John Borthwick and curator Benjamin Weil produced artworks online by Doug Aitken, Jenny Holzer and others on Adaweb and In 1997 MIT's List Visual Arts Center hosted "PORT: Navigating Digital Culture," which included internet art in a gallery space and "time-based Internet projects." Artists in the show included Cary Peppermint, Prema Murthy, Ricardo Dominguez, Helen Thorington, and Adrianne Wortzel. 

Also in 1997 internet art was exhibited at documenta X (directed by Catherine David), with curator Simon Lamunière. The 10 projects presented simultaneously in Kassel and online were those of Matt Mullican, Antoni Muntadas, Holger Friese, Heath Bunting, Felix Stefan Huber & Philip Pocock, Herve Graumann, Jodi, Martin Kippenberger and Carsten Höller among others.

In 2000 the Whitney Museum of American Art included net art in their Biennial exhibit. It was the first time that internet art had been included as a special category in the Biennial, and it marked one of the earliest examples of the inclusion of internet art in a museum setting. Internet artists included Mark Amerika, Fakeshop, Ken Goldberg, etoy and ®™ark.

With the rise of search engines as a gateway to accessing the web in the late 1990s, many net artists turned their attention to related themes. The 2001 'Data Dynamics' exhibit at the Whitney Museum featured 'Netomat' (Maciej Wisniewski) and 'Apartment' - a Turbulence.org commission - (Marek Walczak and Martin Wattenberg), which used search queries as raw material. Mary Flanagan's ' The Perpetual Bed' received attention for its use of 3D nonlinear narrative space, or what she called "navigable narratives."

Her 2001 piece titled 'Collection' shown in the Whitney Biennial displayed items amassed from hard drives around the world in a computational collective unconscious.' Golan Levin's 'The Secret Lives of Numbers' (2000) - also a Turbulence.org commission - visualized the "popularity" of the numbers 1 to 1,000,000 as measured by Alta Vista search results. Such works pointed to alternative interfaces and questioned the dominant role of search engines in controlling access to the net.

Nevertheless, the Internet is not reducible to the web, nor to search engines. 
Besides these unicast (point to point) applications,suggesting the existence of reference points, there is also a multicast (multipoint and uncentered) internet that has been explored by very few artistic experiences, such as the Poietic Generator. Internet art has, according to Juliff and Cox, suffered under the privileging of the user interface inherent within computer art. They argue that Internet is not synonymous with a specific user and specific interface, but rather a dynamic structure that encompasses coding and the artist's intention.

At the same period, original attempts to establish a physical relation between what happened on the web and what would be exhibited in museums were developed by   MUDAM Musée d’Art Contemporain du Luxembourg and most of all by MIXM. At the time, and before platforms like Second Life where Cao Fei developed her RMB City, contemporary artists like Peter Kogler, Heimo Zobernig, Nedko Solakov or Robin Rimbaud aka Scanner realized works online that could be seen in art museums specifically as installations and not just on a computer screen showing internet art. In Solakov’s work for example, one could interact online with objects that were in the exhibition space of the Centre d'Art Contemporain Genève. In Heimo Zobernig’s work, one could physically move a wall to reveal a space in the MAMCO containing a 3d online rendering of the same space.

The emergence of social networking platforms in the mid-2000s facilitated a transformative shift in the distribution of internet art. Early online communities were organized around specific "topical hierarchies", whereas social networking platforms consist of egocentric networks, with the "individual at the center of their own community". Artistic communities on the Internet underwent a similar transition in the mid-2000s, shifting from Surf Clubs, "15 to 30 person groups whose members contributed to an ongoing visual-conceptual conversation through the use of digital media" and whose membership was restricted to a select group of individuals, to image-based social networking platforms, like Flickr, which permit access to any individual with an e-mail address. Internet artists make extensive use of the networked capabilities of social networking platforms, and are rhizomatic in their organization, in that "production of meaning is externally contingent on a network of other artists' content".

Post-Internet

Post-Internet is a loose descriptor for works of art that are derived from the Internet as well as the internet's effects on aesthetics, culture and society. It is a broad term with many associations and has been heavily criticized. 

The term emerged during the mid-2000s and was coined by Internet artist Marisa Olson in 2008.  Discussions about Internet art by Marisa Olson, Gene McHugh, and Artie Vierkant (the latter notable for his Image Objects, a series of deep blue monochrome prints) brought the term to a mainstream consciousness. Between the 2000s and 2010s, post-Internet artists were largely the domain of millennials operating on web platforms such as Tumblr and MySpace or working in social media video and post-narrative formats such as YouTube, Vevo, or memes. 

According to a 2015 article in The New Yorker, the term describes "the practices of artists who ... unlike those of previous generations, [employ] the Web [as] just another medium, like painting or sculpture. Their artworks move fluidly between spaces, appearing sometimes on a screen, other times in a gallery." In the early 2010s, post-Internet was popularly associated with the musician Grimes, visual artists like Cory Arcangel, Artie Vierkant,  Petra Cortrght, Ryan Trecartin and Lizzie Fitch, and Kalup Linzy, and social practice dissensus collectives like DIS and K-HOLE. The movement catapulted a number of hybrid microgenres and subcultures such as bloghouse, bro dubstep, seapunk, electroclash, and vaporwave.

Tools 
Art historian Rachel Greene identified six forms of internet art that existed from 1993 to 1996: email, audio, video, graphics, animation and websites.<ref></5-Arts Net>

In the 1990s, email based mailing lists provided net artists with a community for online discourse that broke boundaries between critical and generative dialogues. The email format allowed instant expression, however limited to text and simple graphic based communication, with an international scope.<5-arts net></ref> These mailing lists allowed for organization which was carried over to face-to-face meetings that facilitated more nuanced conversations, less burdened from miscommunication.

Since the mid-2000s, many artists have used Google's search engine and other services for inspiration and materials. New Google services breed new artistic possibilities. Beginning in 2008, Jon Rafman collected images from Google Street View for his project called The Nine Eyes of Google Street View. Another ongoing net art project is I'm Google by Dina Kelberman which organizes pictures and videos from Google and YouTube around a theme in a grid form that expands as you scroll.

See also

 Art sales
 Artmedia
 ASCII art
 Cyberculture
 Cyberformance
 Digital art
 Electronic literature
 Email art
 Fax art
 Fractal art
 Homestuck
 Hypertext fiction
 Internet aesthetic
 Net.art
 Net-poetry
 Online exhibition
 SITO
 Surfing club
 Telematic art
 Virtual art

References

Bibliography

 Kate Armstrong, Jeremy Bailey & Faisal Anwar on Net Art in Canadian Art Magazine 
 Weibel, Peter and Gerbel, Karl (1995). Welcome in the Net World , @rs electronica 95 Linz. Wien New York: Springer Verlag. 
 Fred Forest 1998,¨Pour un art actuel, l'art à l'heure d'Internet" l'Harmattan, Paris
 Baranski Sandrine, La musique en réseau, une musique de la complexité ? Éditions universitaires européennes, mai 2010
 
 Baumgärtel, Tilman (2001). net.art 2.0 – Neue Materialien zur Netzkunst / New Materials towards Net art. Nürnberg: Verlag für moderne Kunst. .
 Wilson, Stephen (2001). Information Arts: Intersections of Art, Science and Technology. Cambridge, Massachusetts : MIT Press. .
 Caterina Davinio  2002. Tecno-Poesia e realtà virtuali / Techno-Poetry and Virtual Realities, Sometti, Mantua (IT) Collection: Archivio della poesia del 900. Mantua Municipality. With English translation. 
 Stallabrass, Julian (2003). "Internet Art: the online clash of culture and commerce". Tate Publishing. , .
 Christine Buci-Glucksmann, "L’art à l’époque virtuel", in Frontières esthétiques de l’art, Arts 8, Paris: L’Harmattan, 2004
 Greene, Rachel (2004). "Internet Art". Thames and Hudson. , .
 Corby, Tom (2006). "Network Art: Practices and Positions". Routledge, .
 WB05 e-symposium published as ISEA Newsletter #102 -  #102 
 Juliff, Toby & Cox, Travis. 'The Post-display condition of contemporary computer art.' eMaj #8 (April 2015) https://emajartjournal.files.wordpress.com/2012/11/cox-and-juliff_the-post-display-condition-of-contemporary-computer-art.pdf
 Ascott, R.2003. Telematic Embrace: visionary theories of art, technology and consciousness. (Edward A. Shanken, ed.) Berkeley: University of California Press.
Roy Ascott 2002. Technoetic Arts (Editor and Korean translation: YI, Won-Kon), (Media & Art Series no. 6, Institute of Media Art, Yonsei University). Yonsei: Yonsei University Press
 Ascott, R. 1998. Art & Telematics: toward the Construction of New Aesthetics. (Japanese trans. E. Fujihara).  A. Takada &  Y. Yamashita eds. Tokyo:  NTT Publishing Co.,Ltd.
 Fred Forest 2008. Art et Internet, Paris Editions Cercle D'Art / Imaginaire Mode d'Emploi
Thomas Dreher: IASLonline Lessons/Lektionen in NetArt.
 Thomas Dreher: History of Computer Art, chap.VI: Net Art: Networks, Participation, Hypertext
 Monoskop (2010). Overview of 'surf clubs' phenomenon. 
 Art in the Era of the Internet, PBS Report
  Martín Prada, Juan, Prácticas artísticas e Internet en la época de las redes sociales, Editorial AKAL, Madrid, 2012, 
 Bosma, Josephine (2011) "Nettitudes - Let's Talk Net Art"  NAI Publishers, 
 Schneider, B. (2011, January 6). From Clubs to Affinity: The Decentralization of Art on the Internet « 491.  491. Retrieved March 3, 2011, from https://web.archive.org/web/20120707101824/http://fourninetyone.com/2011/01/06/fromclubstoaffinity/
 
 Moss, Ceci. (2008). Thoughts on “New Media Artists v. Artists with Computers". Rhizome Journal. http://rhizome.org/editorial/2008/dec/3/thoughts-on-quotnew-media-artists-vs-artists-with-/
 Greene, Rachel. (2000) A History of Internet Art. Artforum, vol. 38.
 Bookchin, Natalie & Alexei Shulgin (1994-5). Introduction to net.art. Rhizome. http://rhizome.org/artbase/artwork/48530/.
 Atkins, Robert. (1995). The Art World (and I) Go Online. Art in America 83/2.
 Houghton, B. (2002). The Internet & art: A guidebook for artists. Upper Saddle River, NJ: Prentice Hall. .
Bosma, J. (2011). Nettitudes: Let's talk net art. Rotterdam: Nai Publishers. .
 Daniels, D., & Reisinger, G. (2009). Net pioneers 1.0: Contextualizing early net-based art. Berlin: Sternberg Press. .

External links
 netartnet.net an online-gallery listing and directory of internet art
 > ¿netart or notart? < netart latino database
 An interview with Martijn Hendriks & Katja Novitskova
"The New Aesthetic and its Politics"
 

2000s in art
2010s in art
Internet culture
 
New media art
Digital art
Theories of aesthetics
 
Metanarratives
Philosophical schools and traditions